The 2007 Asian Judo Championships were held in Kuwait City, Kuwait from 16 May to 17 May 2007.

Medal summary

Men

Women

Medal table

External links
 
Result of the Asian Judo Championships (Judo Union of Asia)
Results of the 2007 Asian Judo Championships (International Judo Federation)

Asian Championships
Asian Judo Championships
Asian Judo Championships
International sports competitions hosted by Kuwait
21st century in Kuwait City
Sport in Kuwait City
Judo competitions in Kuwait